Plestiodon anthracinus, the coal skink, is a species of lizard which is endemic to North America.

Description
It is a four-lined skink whose light stripes extend onto the tail. The broad dark lateral stripe is 4-4.5 scales wide and there are no light lines on top of the head. The dorsolateral light stripe is on the edges of the 3rd and 4th scale rows, counting from midline of back. One postmental scale is present. The sides of the head of the male are reddish during spring breeding season, at least in some parts of the range.

Taxonomy
Two subspecies of the coal skink are recognized, including the nominotypical subspecies:

Northern coal skink - Plestiodon anthracinus anthracinus Baird, 1850
Southern coal skink - Plestiodon anthracinus pluvialis (Cope, 1880)

The (northern) coal skink was first described by Baird in 1850; the southern subspecies P. a. pluvialis was identified by Cope in 1880.

The southern coal skink as a subspecies has posterior supralabials with light centers and dark edges, producing a spotted appearance. There are 26 or more rows of scales around the middle of the body.

Reproduction
The coal skink mates in spring or early summer, laying a clutch of 8 or 9 eggs. The hatchlings have a blue tail; those of the northern coal skink are striped like the adults, but young southern coal skinks have black bodies with at the utmost faint traces of stripes.

Habitat and Geographic range
Coal skink distribution

The more humid portions of wooded hillsides with abundant leaf litter or loose stones are favorite habitats. Coal skinks' habitat may also include areas around springs and rocky bluffs overlooking creek valleys. If pursued, they will take refuge in shallow water, going to the bottom and hiding under stones or debris.

The northern coal skink (blue in the figure) occurs in western New York and central Pennsylvania and in isolated colonies in the Appalachians. The southern coal skink (orange) can be found on the eastern Gulf coast from the Florida panhandle to Louisiana as well as west of the Mississippi from eastern Kansas and central Missouri to eastern Texas and northern Louisiana. Scattered intermingled occurrences of both subspecies (green in the figure) occur in Alabama and in Georgia.

References

Further reading
Baird, S.F. 1850. Revision of the North American Tailed-Batrachia, with descriptions of new genera and species. Journ. Acad. Nat. Sci. Philadelphia ("Second Series") 1: 281-294. (Plestiodon anthracinus, p. 294.)
Behler, J.L., and F.W. King. 1979. The Audubon Society Field Guide to North American Reptiles and Amphibians. Knopf. New York. 743 pp. . (Eumeces anthracinus, pp. 568–569 + Plates 425, 429.)
Boulenger, G.A. 1887. Catalogue of the Lizards in the British Museum (Natural History). Second Edition. Volume III. Lacertidæ, Gerrhosauridæ, Scincidæ,... Trustees of the British Museum (Natural History). (Taylor and Francis, printers.) London. xii + 575 pp. + Plates I.- XL. (Eumeces anthracinus, p. 376; Eumeces pluvialis, p. 376.)
Conant, R. 1975. A Field Guide to Reptiles and Amphibians of Eastern and Central North America, Second Edition. Houghton Mifflin. Boston. xviii + 429 pp.  (hardcover),  (paperback). (Eumeces anthracinus, pp. 126–127, Figure 29 + Plate 19 + Map 80.)
Cope, E.D. 1880. On the Zoological Position of Texas. Bulletin of the United States National Museum (17): 1-51. ("Eumeces pluvialis sp. nov.", p. 19.)
Smith, H.M. 1946. Handbook of Lizards: Lizards of the United States and of Canada. Comstock. Ithaca, New York. 557 pp. (Eumeces anthracinus, p. 372.)
Smith, H.M., and E.D. Brodie, Jr. 1982. Reptiles of North America: A Guide to Field Identification. Golden Press. New York. 240 pp. . (Eumeces anthracinus, pp. 76–77.)

External links
Description from the U.S. Army Corps of Engineers.

anthracinus
Lizards of North America
Skink, Coal
Skink, Coal
Reptiles of the United States
Reptiles described in 1850
Taxa named by Spencer Fullerton Baird